Aghbolagh-e Ali Akbar Khan (also Romanized as Āghbolāgh-e ‘Alī Akbar Khān; also known as Āqbolāgh-e ‘Alīakbar Khān and Āq Bolāgh-e ‘Alī Akbar Khān) is a village in Siyah Mansur Rural District, in the Central District of Bijar County, Kurdistan Province, Iran. At the 2006 census, its population was 170, in 34 families. The village is populated by Kurds.

References 

Towns and villages in Bijar County
Kurdish settlements in Kurdistan Province